"Another Sleepless Night" is a song written by Charlie Black and Rory Bourke, and recorded by Canadian country music artist Anne Murray.  It was released in January 1982 as the fourth single from her album Where Do You Go When You Dream.  The song reached No. 1 on the RPM Country Tracks chart in Canada and #4 on the Billboard Hot Country Singles chart in the United States.

Content
The song, light and uptempo, was a bit of a departure for Murray, whose previous few singles had all been slower-tempo ballads. The narrator notes how it had been hard to sleep during recent nights, as her lover had been away, but then speculates that, with his return, it will yet be "another sleepless night", but this time because they'll be up all night "making romance".

Charts

Weekly charts

Year-end charts

References

External links
 

1982 singles
1982 songs
1981 songs
Anne Murray songs
Songs written by Rory Bourke
Song recordings produced by Jim Ed Norman
Capitol Records singles
Songs written by Charlie Black